Lowndes County Public Schools (LCPS) is a school district serving Lowndes County, Alabama, headquartered in Hayneville.

Schools
Secondary:
 Central High School (Lowndes County, Alabama)
 Hayneville Middle School
 Lowndes Middle School
 The Calhoun School

Elementary:
 Central Elementary School
 Fort Deposit Elementary School
 Jackson Steele Elementary School

Other
 Lowndes County Head Start

History
Calhoun Colored School was a private boarding and day school in Calhoun, Alabama from 1892 until 1945.

In 1906 there was a Hayneville Graded School. In 1908 there was a Hayneville High School. Lois Janette Rogers was valedictorian there.

The Calhoun School, sometimes referred to as Calhoun High School, is at 8213 County Road 33 in Letohatchee, Alabama. The vast majority of students are African American and from low income families. The school serves about 200 students. Tigers are the school mascot and blue and white are the school colors. The school is in a rural area.

References

External links
 Lowndes County Public Schools

School districts in Alabama
Lowndes County, Alabama